This article is about the demographic features of the population of Luxembourg, including population density, education level, health of the populace, economic status, religious affiliations and other aspects of the population.

The following is an overview of the demographics of Luxembourg. Demographic topics include basic statistics, most populous cities, and religious affiliation.

The population of Luxembourg as of 1 January 2022 was 645,397 (52.87% Luxembourgers and 47.13% of foreign nationality).

The people of Luxembourg are called Luxembourgers.

Population 
The population of Luxembourg in 2022 is 650,364.

Population growth rate 
1.8% (2020 est.)

Total fertility rate

1.62 children born/woman (2020 est.)

Life expectancy 

Source: UN World Population Prospects

Age structure 
(2020 est.)
0–14 years: 16.73% (male 54 099; female 51 004)
15–24 years: 11.78% (male 37,946; female 36 061)
25-54 years:  43.93% (male 141,535/female 134,531)
55-64 years: 12.19% (male 39,289/female 37,337)
65 years and over: 15.37% (male 43,595/female 52,984)

Vital statistics 

The following table chronicles factors such as population, birth rates, and death rates in Luxembourg since 1900.

Fertility
In 2020, 64% of children born in Luxembourg were to mothers of foreign origin, both from other EU member states and from non-EU countries.

Immigration

Luxembourg does not formally collect ethnic or racial data of its citizens. The foreign population resident in Luxembourg currently numbers over 296,465, corresponding to 47.4% of the total population (compared to 13.2% in 1961). That means there are currently almost as many immigrants as there are native citizens. These immigrants are overwhelmingly nationals of EU countries (accounting for over 80%), by far the greater part of whom originally come from Portugal, Italy and the two neighbouring countries, France and Belgium. For some years, there has also been a large increase in the number of immigrants and asylum seekers from the countries of Eastern Europe, and especially the new republics to have emerged from the former Yugoslavia (Bosnia and Herzegovina, Serbia and Montenegro). These immigrants include a considerable proportion of young people. Immigrants (especially asylum seekers) have a strong impact on the birth rate, accounting for nearly 50% of births in Luxembourg.

A more detailed breakdown by nationality shows that the Portuguese community is still the largest group, accounting for almost a third of the foreign population. The Italian population has been stable for the past ten years at approximately 20,000. Some 80,000 foreigners come from bordering countries (France, Belgium and Germany).

Religion
The predominant religion of the Luxembourg population is Roman Catholic, with Protestant, Anglican, Jewish, Muslim and Hindu minorities. According to a 1979 law, the government forbids collection of data on religious practices, but over 90% is estimated to be baptized Catholic (the Virgin Mary is the Patroness of the city of Luxembourg).

The Lutherans are the largest Protestant denomination in the country. Muslims are estimated to number approximately 6000 persons, notably including 1,500 refugees from Montenegro; Orthodox (Albanian, Greek, Montenegrin, Serbian, Russian, and Romanian) adherents are estimated to number approximately 5,000 persons, along with approximately 1,000 Jews. Freedom of religion is provided by the Luxembourg Constitution.

CIA World Factbook demographic statistics 

The following demographic statistics are from the CIA World Factbook.

Language 
The languages of Luxembourg are;

Luxembourgish (official administrative, commonly used,  judicial language) 55.8%, Portuguese 15.7%, French (official administrative, judicial, and legislative language) 12.1%, German (official administrative and judicial language) 3.1%, Italian 2.9%, English 2.1%, other 8.4% (2011 est.)

References

 
Health in Luxembourg
Society of Luxembourg